Kim Tae-ho (born 5 June 1952) is a South Korean boxer. He competed in the men's lightweight event at the 1972 Summer Olympics.

References

1952 births
Living people
South Korean male boxers
Olympic boxers of South Korea
Boxers at the 1972 Summer Olympics
Place of birth missing (living people)
Asian Games medalists in boxing
Boxers at the 1970 Asian Games
Boxers at the 1974 Asian Games
Asian Games gold medalists for South Korea
Asian Games bronze medalists for South Korea
Medalists at the 1970 Asian Games
Medalists at the 1974 Asian Games
Lightweight boxers